Jacques Joseph Caron (born April 21, 1940) is a Canadian former ice hockey player and coach. He played 72 games in the National Hockey League with the Los Angeles Kings, St. Louis Blues, and Vancouver Canucks between 1967 and 1974, and 26 games in the World Hockey Association with the Cleveland Crusaders and Cincinnati Stingers between 1975 and 1977. After his playing career he worked as an assistant coach with the Hartford Whalers, and then the goaltending coach and special assignment coach with the New Jersey Devils from 1993 to 2017. With New Jersey he won the Stanley Cup three times.

Career statistics

Regular season and playoffs

See also
List of New Jersey Devils head coaches

External links
 

1940 births
Living people
Binghamton Whalers players
Canadian expatriate ice hockey players in the United States
Canadian ice hockey goaltenders
Charlotte Checkers (EHL) players
Cincinnati Stingers players
Cleveland Crusaders players
Denver Spurs (WHL) players
Hartford Whalers coaches
Ice hockey people from Quebec
Los Angeles Kings players
New Jersey Devils coaches
St. Louis Blues players
Sportspeople from Rouyn-Noranda
Springfield Falcons players
Stanley Cup champions
Syracuse Eagles players
Toronto Maple Leafs coaches
Vancouver Canucks players